Gaumont is a French surname. Notable people with the surname include:

Dominique Gaumont (1953–1983), French guitarist
Édouard Gaumont (1915–2008), French Guianese politician
Léon Gaumont (1864–1946), French inventor and industrialist, pioneer of the movie industry
Marcel Gaumont (1880-1962), French sculptor
Philippe Gaumont (1973–2013), French cyclist

French-language surnames